Se Arrienda is a 2005 Chilean film directed by Alberto Fuguet and starring Luciano Cruz-Coke. The film follows the fictional life of Gastón Fernández, a composer in his thirties who has achieved little career success since composing the score to a B movie during his time as a student.

Plot 
At the end of the 1980s, the young musician Gastón Fernández (Luciano Cruz-Coke) had a brilliant future ahead of him, along with his group of dreamer and idealist friends. Fifteen years later, fate has separated them. Gastón returns to Chile and faces a different country and the frustration of artistic success that never came. While his friends enjoy prosperity, memories torment him. Forced by circumstances, Gastón must compromise by working in his father's real estate agency, thus beginning a journey where he will meet Elisa (Francisca Lewin) and understand life without the weight of the past.

Cast 
 Luciano Cruz-Coke
 Felipe Braun 
 Francisca Lewin 
 Jaime Vadell 
 Ignacia Allamand
 Diego Casanueva 
 Cristóbal Gumucio 
 Nicolás Saavedra 
 Benjamín Vicuña 
 Ariel Levy 
 María Cristina Peña y Lillo

See also 
 Cinema of Chile

References

External links

2005 films
2000s Spanish-language films
2005 drama films
Chilean drama films